Roberto Donati (born March 15, 1983 in Rieti) is an Italian sprinter.

Biography
Roberto Donati won two medals at the International athletics competitions, all of these with national relays team. He has 4 caps in national team from 2009 to 2010. He is the brother of Massimiliano Donati.

Achievements

National titles
He has won two times the individual national championship.
 2 wins in 200 metres (2009, 2010)

See also
 Italy national relay team

References

External links
 

1983 births
Living people
Italian male sprinters
People from Rieti
Athletics competitors of Gruppo Sportivo Esercito
European Athletics Championships medalists
World Athletics Championships athletes for Italy
Italian Athletics Championships winners
Sportspeople from the Province of Rieti